Carenzia inermis is a species of extremely small deep water sea snail, a marine gastropod mollusk in the family Seguenziidae.

Description
The height of the shell attains 6.8 mm.

Distribution
This species occurs in the Pacific Ocean off Oregon, USA.

References

External links
 To Biodiversity Heritage Library (1 publication)
 To Encyclopedia of Life
 To World Register of Marine Species

inermis
Gastropods described in 1983